Edward Bennet (1845 – 24 November 1910), of Newmarket-on-Fergus, was the second president of the Gaelic Athletic Association (1887–1888).

A participant in the 1867 Rising, Bennet was involved in athletics in Co. Clare, as well as the Land League and Home Rule movements.

Bennet became the first chairman of the Clare GAA county committee.

By 1887, the GAA had become split along political lines. Bennet received the nomination of the IRB, and was elected president. His presidency was brief, however, lasting only two months before Archbishop Croke intervened to heal the split. Maurice Davin was re-elected, and Bennet lost not only his presidency, but his place on the Clare county board.

References

 

1845 births
1910 deaths
Chairmen of county boards of the Gaelic Athletic Association
Clare County Board administrators
Presidents of the Gaelic Athletic Association